Sir William Reid Dick,  (13 January 1878 – 1 October 1961) was a Scottish sculptor known for his innovative stylisation of form in his monument sculptures and simplicity in his portraits.  He became an Associate of the Royal Academy in 1921, and a Royal Academician in 1928.  Dick served as president of the Royal Society of British Sculptors from 1933 to 1938. He was knighted by King George V in 1935. He was Sculptor in Ordinary for Scotland to King George VI from 1938 to 1952 then held the post under Queen Elizabeth until his death in 1961.

Biography

Early life
Born into a working-class family in the Gorbals, Glasgow, Dick was apprenticed to a firm of stonemasons at the age of twelve and during the next five years he learned to carve stone and took evening classes at the Glasgow School of Art. In 1892, under the supervision of George Frampton, Dick worked on some of the external carvings for the Kelvingrove Art Gallery and completed his apprenticeship in 1896. From 1904 to 1907, Dick returned to the Glasgow School of Art to take a mixture of day and evening classes in drawing and sculpture. In 1907, he graduated and accepted a teaching position at the Bellshill Academy in Lanarkshire but moved to London in 1908. There Dick took evening classes at the South London Technical School of Art whilst working as a studio assistant for the sculptor Edwin Whitney-Smith. Also in 1908, Dick had his first work exhibited at the Royal Academy in London. He earned further recognition in 1911 with a marble bust of Harry Lauder which was also shown at the Royal Academy.

In 1914 Dick married Catherine Emma Treadwell, with whom he had three children. The couple lived in the St John's Wood area of London until 1938 when they purchased a large house and studio in Maida Vale, where they lived for the rest of their lives.

World War I

In September 1914 Dick joined the Territorial Army and from 1915 to 1919 served with the Royal Engineers in both France and Palestine. When Dick enlisted in September 1914 he joined the 5th London Field Ambulance section of the Royal Army Medical Corps and subsequently transferred to the 3rd Army Field Survey Co, part of the Royal Engineers and then the 7th Field Survey Co. He was described as a photographer with the 7th Field Survey Co. His Army Service record shows his profession as "sculptor". He was awarded the 1914-15 Star and the British War and Victory Medals. While serving in northern France, Dick produced a number of small statuettes by using the local clay deposits.

Post-war career
Dick designed several war memorials notably at Bushey, at Rickmansworth and the eagle sculpture atop the Royal Air Force Memorial on the Victoria Embankment in London. He received a major commission for the Kitchener Memorial Chapel (1922–25) in St Paul's Cathedral, London. The focal point of this design was a Pièta, which won a gold medal at the Paris International Exhibition of Modern Decorative and Industrial Arts in 1925. These works secured his reputation and election to the Royal Academy in 1928, having been elected an Associate member in 1921. His work was part of the sculpture event in the art competition at the 1928 Summer Olympics. In 1935 Dick was Knighted and elected President of the Royal Society of British Sculptors, a post he held until 1938. From 1938 to 1952 Dick served as King's Sculptor in Ordinary for Scotland and then, from 1952 until his death, Dick was the Queen's Sculptor in Ordinary for Scotland. He attended numerous royal events and created several portraits and memorials to members of the Royal Family plus several busts of political and artistic figures of the time.

Alongside the public monuments and memorials Dick created he also sculpted busts and statuettes which he exhibited on a regular basis at the Royal Academy, at the Royal Glasgow Institute of the Fine Arts, the Royal Scottish Academy, the Royal Scottish Watercolour Society and at the Paris Salon. Dick was elected to the Royal Scottish Academy in 1939. Throughout his career, Dick served on numerous committees, among these the Royal Fine Art Commission (1928–42), the Royal Mint Advisory Committee (1936–53), and the Board of Trustees of the Tate Gallery (1934–41).

Dick died at his home in Maida Vale and was cremated at Golders Green crematorium. In October 1963 a memorial tablet to him was unveiled in the crypt of St Pauls' Cathedral. His archives are held by the Tate Gallery.

Public works

1920–1929

1930–1939

1940 and later

Other works
Bust of Lady Rhoda Birley in 1908?.
A series of figures for St Andrew's House in Edinburgh, 1939, representing Architecture, Statecraft, Health, Agriculture, Fisheries and Education
Harry Dwight Ripley Monument, St. Marylebone Cemetery and Crematorium.
Bronze bust of Winston Churchill, 1943.
A bust of George V for the Mansion House in London.
A marble bust of Edwin Lutyens, 1932, for the Marble Hall of Rashtrapati Bhavan, New Delhi
Bust of Queen Elizabeth, the Queen Mother in Bolton Town Hall, c. 1946
Bust of Adelaide Stoll, London Coliseum

Several public galleries, including the Tate in Britain and the Art Gallery of New South Wales in Sydney, hold collections of works by Dick.

References

Further reading
Wardleworth, Dennis (2013). William Reid Dick, Sculptor. Farnham: Ashgate. .

External links

Images of Reid Dick in National Portrait Gallery, London

1879 births
1961 deaths

20th-century Scottish sculptors
Artists from Glasgow
Alumni of the Glasgow School of Art
British Army personnel of World War I
Burials at St Paul's Cathedral
Military personnel from Glasgow
Olympic competitors in art competitions
People from Gorbals
Royal Academicians
Royal Army Medical Corps soldiers
Royal Engineers soldiers
Scottish knights
Scottish male sculptors
Scottish schoolteachers
Scottish sculptors